In number theory, a branch of mathematics, Dickson's conjecture is the conjecture stated by  that for a finite set of linear forms , , ...,  with , there are infinitely many positive integers  for which they are all prime, unless there is a congruence condition preventing this . The case k = 1 is Dirichlet's theorem.

Two other special cases are well-known conjectures: there are infinitely many twin primes (n and 2 + n are primes), and there are infinitely many Sophie Germain primes (n and 1 + 2n are primes).

Dickson's conjecture is further extended by Schinzel's hypothesis H.

Generalized Dickson's conjecture

Given n polynomials with positive degrees and integer coefficients (n can be any natural number) that each satisfy all three conditions in the Bunyakovsky conjecture, and for any prime p there is an integer x such that the values of all n polynomials at x are not divisible by p, then there are infinitely many positive integers x such that all values of these n polynomials at x are prime. For example, if the conjecture is true then there are infinitely many positive integers x such that x2 + 1, 3x - 1, and x2 + x + 41 are all prime. When all the polynomials have degree 1, this is the original Dickson's conjecture.

This more general conjecture is the same as the Generalized Bunyakovsky conjecture.

See also
 Prime triplet
 Green–Tao theorem
 First Hardy–Littlewood conjecture
 Prime constellation
 Primes in arithmetic progression

References

Conjectures about prime numbers
Unsolved problems in number theory